The White Horse Tavern, located in New York City's borough of Manhattan at Hudson Street and 11th Street, is known for its 1950s and 1960s bohemian culture. It is one of the few major gathering-places for writers and artists from this period in Greenwich Village (specifically the West Village) that remains open. The bar opened in 1880 but was known more as a longshoremen's bar than a literary center until Dylan Thomas and other writers began frequenting it in the early 1950s. Because of its literary fame, the White Horse has become a popular destination among tourists.

History
The bar is one of the oldest continuously operating in New York City. Steve Croman purchased the building that houses the tavern in 2019. Eytan Sugarman signed a fifteen year lease for the establishment that year. After assuming the lease, Sugarman made cosmetic changes to the interior and modified the menu.

Notable patrons

The White Horse Tavern was renowned as a gathering place for writers. It and the Lion's Head "were two favorite writers' bars."

The White Horse is perhaps most famous as the place where Jason Mitchell drank heavily with Dylan Thomas, who returned to the Chelsea Hotel, became ill, and died a few days later of unrelated causes. Other famous patrons include James Baldwin, The Clancy Brothers (who also performed at the establishment), Bob Dylan, Richard Farina, Michael Harrington, Matt Sullivan,  Jane Jacobs, Seymour Krim, Norman Mailer, Jim Morrison, Adam Leonard, Delmore Schwartz,  Hunter S. Thompson, and Mary Travers.

Another of the White Horse's famous patrons is Jack Kerouac, who was bounced from the establishment more than once. Because of this someone scrawled on the bathroom wall: "KEROUAC GO HOME!" At that time, Kerouac was staying in an apartment in the building located on the NW corner of West 11th St.

About the same time, the White Horse was a gathering-place for labor members and organizers and socialists, as well. The Catholic Workers hung out here and the idea for the Village Voice was discussed here. The Village Voice original offices were within blocks of the White Horse. Much of the content was discussed here by the editors.

In popular culture

When in  Mad Men season 4, episode 2, Don Draper returns to his Waverly Place apartment stumbling drunk and his neighbor Phoebe (who helps him in) asks where he's coming from, Don replies, "Work."  She responds, "Where do you work? The White Horse Tavern"?
In the How I Met Your Mother episode "Right Place, Right Time", when Marshall goes through a phase of creating all sorts of charts and graphs from work, he makes a pie chart of his favorite bars. The White Horse Tavern is listed on the chart as 12% "(In Percentage of Awesomeness)".
In The Carrie Diaries Season 2 finale, there is a shot of the White Horse Tavern in the final scene. It is also referenced in the novel Summer and the City, in which the show is partially based on.
The Tavern, and the drink of the same name, are referenced by the characters Steve and Ghost in Poppy Z. Brite's novel Drawing Blood.
“The whiskey was a good start. I got the idea from Dylan Thomas. He's this poet who drank twenty-one straight whiskeys at the White Horse Tavern in New York and then died on the spot from alcohol poisoning. I've always wanted to hear the bartender's side of the story. What was it like watching this guy drink himself out of here? How did it feel handing him number twenty-one and watching his face crumple up before the fall of the stool? And did he already have number twenty-two poured, waiting for this big fat tip, and then have to drink it himself after whoever came took the body away?”
― Michael Thomas Ford, Suicide Notes

References

External links 
 Website
 Profile from New York Magazine

Drinking establishments in Greenwich Village
1880 establishments in New York (state)